The Melbourne Reds were a Victorian-based baseball team in the Australian Baseball League. They were the only team to win the championship 3 times. The Reds originally played at the home of VFL/AFL football, Waverley Park from 1989 until the 1994 Championship, when they moved to the former home ground of the St Kilda Football Club, Moorabbin Oval for the 1994/95 Championship and played there until the end of Australian Baseball League in 1999.

History

Birth of the Reds
After the 1988 Claxton Shield the idea of an Australian Baseball League was floated, with the Waverley Baseball Club being one of the strongest clubs in Victorian Baseball they stepped forward in instigating a team to represent the south-east of Melbourne, and the Waverley Reds were created.

In the first Australian Baseball League championship the Reds went through the season winning 34 out of 40 games, with a home record of 17 wins 2 losses, the Reds went into the championship series favourites against cross town rival the Melbourne Monarchs winning 3 out of the 4-game series to become the inaugural Australian Baseball League Champions.

The Waverley Baseball Club were the original majority owners and managers of the team, until it was foreseen that ownership of the team was not going to be a profitable exercise and distanced themselves to avoid future debts affecting the future of the baseball club.

After Waverley
An obliging suitor soon appeared when young American Andy Karetsky arrived with a healthy bankroll of US dollars and a determination to become involved with baseball club ownership in Australia. Karetsky had made his fortune at the New York stock exchange and had first made overtures to buy into the Perth Heat club, before finding that the Waverley Reds were seeking a new majority owner.

Andy Karetsky was certainly a "forward thinking" guy who, quite truthfully, may have been a bit ahead of his time in terms of his visions for the Waverley Reds. He had plenty of lofty visions for the club based on his experiences with US baseball, but it is possible that he found these not so easy to "translate" into the Australian market. Certainly, whatever anyone may have thought about Karetsky's style and decision making, everything he did was with the best intentions for the Waverley Reds. He dearly loved "his team" and he was driven to make them succeed on and off the field! He moved the team from Waverley Park to Moorabbin Oval before the 1994/95 Championship. It was towards the end of the "Karetsky era" that he officially changed the name of the team from Waverley Reds to Melbourne Reds before the 1995/96 season, in the hope of broadening the supporter base of the club. However, Karetsky had to sell his ownership of the Reds due to personal reasons a short time later.

Decline of the ABL
After Karetsky, local baseball junkie and businessman Geoff Pearce purchased the majority ownership of the Reds, leading into the most difficult time of the ABL. Dwindling crowd numbers, severe lack of media attention and the ever-shrinking budget of the club took away a lot of the early excitement and entertainment from the Reds games. However, with all these factors Pearce lead the club to its last hurrah in the 1997/98 Championship, becoming the only team to win the ABL competition 3 times.

Late into the 1998–99 Australian Baseball League championship, the Reds were in the process of making a deal with ACES Sporting Club in Keysborough to convert their golf driving range into a light baseball diamond with grandstand to be the home of the Reds, however with the Australian Baseball League collapse after the 1999 Championship this deal never went ahead, however the Sporting Club entered into a sponsorship with the successor Victorian team after the ABL, the Victoria Aces as naming rights sponsors of the team.

Seasons

The Reds were one of the most successful team in ABL history, having won the Championship title 3 times.

1989–90

The first season of ABL play the Reds burst out of the blocks winning 34 out of the 40 games, only losing 2 games at home. The Reds played off with cross-town rivals, the Melbourne Monarchs, winning 3 out of the 4 play-off games to take out the Inaugural ABL championship.

1990–91

1991–92

1992–93

1993–94

1994–95

In their first season at Morrabbin Oval the Reds, with many new faces (most notably, Australian Major League superstar David Nilsson), the reds won 44 of the 58 games. Facing the 4th-placed Sydney Blues in the "Best of 3" Semi-Finals, the Reds defeated the Blues 5–1 in Game 1, and then 7–4 in Game 2, allowing the Reds to qualify for the Championship Series against Perth Heat. The Reds defeated Heat 5–1 in game 1, and then 4–2 in game 2 of the series to win their second ABL Championship.

1995–96

1996–97

1997–98

After finishing last in the previous Championship the reds were looking for redemption. The Reds finished in the top 4 to qualify for the "3-day Round Robin Series" to be played at the Melbourne Ballpark. Facing the Sydney Storm on Day 1, the Reds easily accounted for the Storm 18–5. Day 2 saw the Reds win a tight game against the Gold Coast Cougars winning 2–1. Day 3 the Reds faced off with cross-town rival Melbourne Monarchs in a dead rubber, the Monarchs winning 12–5.
The Reds then played off with the Gold Coast Cougars, which saw the Reds run out winners 4–3 in game 1, and then 4–0 in game 2, to become the only team to take out the Australian Baseball League Championship 3 times.

1998–99

Uniform 
 
Waverley white with red trim top with "Reds" across the front, Red undershirt, white pants with red double strip down the leg, white socks with red t-bars.

Melbourne Home – white with red trim top with "Reds" across the front, navy blue undershirt, white pants with red strip down the leg, white socks with red t-bars. Away – same as home but with grey where white is.

See also
List of Waverley/Melbourne Reds players
Waverley/Melbourne Reds top 10 statistics

External links
The Australian Baseball League: 1989–1999
The History of the Waverley/Melbourne Reds

 
Australian Baseball League (1989–1999) teams
Defunct baseball teams in Australia